Carl Engel von der Rabenau (1817-1870), a German painter, was born at Londorf, and died at Rödelheim, today part of Frankfurt am Main.

The Darmstadt Gallery has a View of the Studio of the Sculptor , by him. Another painting Family Portrait of Councillor Debus from 1840 was added to the museum's collection, donated by the Museumsverein of Darmstadt in 2011.

See also
 List of German painters

References

 

1817 births
1870 deaths
19th-century German painters
German male painters
People from Giessen (district)
19th-century German male artists